Windsbach is a town in the district of Ansbach, in Bavaria, Germany. It is situated 20 km east of Ansbach, and 29 km southwest of Nuremberg.

Geography

Location
Windsbach is located in the Rangau area on the river Franconian Rezat. The city's position is 20 km eastward of the district capital Ansbach and 40 km southwestern of Nuremberg. Beside the Franconian Rezat the Aurach, a tributary of the Rednitz flows through the community area.

The following communities surround Windsbach (beginning north going clockwise direction): Rohr, Kammerstein, Abenberg, Spalt, Mitteleschenbach, Wolframs-Eschenbach, Lichtenau, Neuendettelsau and Heilsbronn.

Suburbs
Windsbach consists out of 29 suburbs:

Politics
 First mayor: Matthias Seitz (SPD)
 Second mayor: Norbert Kleinöder (Hinterland of Windsbach)
 Third mayor: Karl Schuler (SPD)

City Council

The City Council has (including the 1. Mayor) 21 members:

(Status: Municipal Elections of 2 March 2008)

Famous institutions
Windsbach is famous for its high school, the Johann-Sebastian-Bach-Gymnasium, which is named after the composer Johann Sebastian Bach. It is one of the best schools in Bavaria and teaches among other things modern languages (English, French, Italian, Russian, Spanish, e. g.), old languages (Latin, Old Greek), maths, physics and chemistry (of course there are much more standard subjects like history, geography, biology, religious education, P.E., art e.g.)

Windsbach is also the home of the Windsbach Boys Choir founded in 1946 and from 1978 to 2012 under the direction of Karl-Friedrich Beringer. The choir is one of the most renowned boy's choirs of the world.

Memberships
Windsbach is member in the following institutions and organisations:
 German-American Society of West Middle Franconia e.V.
 Regional Community Alliance "kommA"

References

External links

  
 Homepage of the Windsbach Boys Choir
 Homepage of the Music School of Windsbach
 Homepage of the Johann-Sebastian-Bach High School of Windsbach
 Homepage of the Windsbach Fire Department

Ansbach (district)